The following is a list of fictional government agencies that have appeared in the mythical universes of various comic books.

A

B

C

D

E-F

G-N

O-P

Q-R

S

T-Z

See also

 List of government agencies in DC Comics
 List of government agencies in Marvel Comics

External links
 DC Comics: Heroes & Villains
 Marvel Universe: The Official Marvel Wiki
 Don Markstein's Toonopedia

Government agencies in comics, List of
List of government agencies in comics